The 2017-18 Big Bash League season was the seventh season of the Big Bash League, the premier Twenty20 cricket competition in Australia. Each team could sign a minimum of 18 players, including two rookies and two visa contracted players.

Adelaide Strikers

Brisbane Heat

Hobart Hurricanes

Melbourne Renegades

Melbourne Stars

References

2017–18 Big Bash League
Big Bash League cricketers
Big Bash League lists